Daegu Bank Station is a station of the Daegu Metro Line 2 in Suseong-dong, Suseong District, Daegu, South Korea. There are Daegu Bank headquarters around the station.

See also 
 Daegu Bank

External links 
  Cyber station information from Daegu Metropolitan Transit Corporation

Daegu Metro stations
Suseong District
Railway stations opened in 2005